Podperaea is a genus of Asian mosses in the family Hypnaceae. It was erected by Zennosuke Iwatsuki and Janice Mildred Glime.

Species 
Podperaea contains a total of 2 species:

References

Hypnaceae
Moss genera